Georgios Chortatzis or Chortatsis (c. 1545 – c. 1610) was a Greek dramatist in Cretan verse. He was, along with Vitsentzos Kornaros, one of the main representatives of a school of literature in the vernacular Cretan dialect that flourished in the late 16th and early 17th centuries under Venetian rule. His best-known work is Erofili (or Erophile), a tragedy set in Egypt.

References

1545 births
1610 deaths
People from Rethymno
Greek dramatists and playwrights
Cretan poets
Cretan Renaissance literature